Ellen Catherine Hildreth is a professor of computer science at Wellesley College. Her fields are visual perception and computer vision. She co-invented the Marr-Hildreth algorithm along with David Marr.

She completed all of her higher education at the Massachusetts Institute of Technology. She earned a Bachelor of Science in Mathematics in 1977, a Master of Science from the Department of Electrical Engineering and Computer Science (EECS) in 1980, and a Ph.D. from EECS in 1983. Her thesis, "The Measurement of Visual Motion", won an Honorable Mention from the Association for Computing Machinery.

She is a Fellow of the Association for the Advancement of Artificial Intelligence and the Institute of Electrical and Electronics Engineers.

Hildreth is married to Eric Grimson. The couple have two sons.

References

Artificial intelligence researchers
Computer vision researchers
Fellows of the Association for the Advancement of Artificial Intelligence
Massachusetts Institute of Technology School of Science alumni
MIT School of Engineering faculty
Wellesley College faculty
MIT School of Engineering alumni
Living people
Year of birth missing (living people)